The Lovers is a 1994 Hong Kong romantic film based on the Chinese legend of the Butterfly Lovers. It was directed and produced by Tsui Hark, and starred Nicky Wu, Charlie Yeung, Elvis Tsui and Carrie Ng. The theme songs were performed by Nicky Wu.

Cast
 Nicky Wu as Leung San-pak
 Charlie Yeung as Chuk Ying-toi
 Elvis Tsui as Master Chuk
 Carrie Ng as Sin Yuk-ting
 Lau Shun as Chung Kwai
 Sun Xing as Monk
 Linda Lau as Madam Yuen
 Hau Bing-ying as Ingenue
 Yuen Sam as Mr Ching
 Shum Hoi-yung as Madam Leung
 Peter Ho as Ting Mong-chun
 Franco Jiang
 Cheng Tung-chuen
 Goon Goon
 Woo Wai-ling
 Lam Ching-man

Awards and nominations
 14th Hong Kong Film Awards
 Won Best Original Film Score: James Wong
 Nominations:
 Best Director: Tsui Hark
 Best Supporting Actress: Carrie Ng
 Best Art Direction: William Chang
 Best Costume Make Up Design: William Chang

External links
 

1994 films
Hong Kong romantic drama films
1990s Cantonese-language films
1990s romance films
Films set in the Eastern Jin (317–420)
Films directed by Tsui Hark
1990s Hong Kong films